Ysgol Uwchradd Tywyn is a bilingual coeducational secondary school for pupils aged between 11 and 16 years. It is situated in Tywyn, Gwynedd.

As of 2018, around 19% of pupils come from Welsh-speaking homes.

History
It was opened as 'Towyn Intermediate School' in 1894 in a building called Brynarfor (formerly a private school called the Towyn Academy and then Brynarvor Hall School). Brynarfor was demolished in 2008.

In 2015, the Welsh Government declared it the secondary school with the highest standards in Wales, as defined by its school categorisation system.

Feeder schools
The following primary schools feed (or fed) Ysgol Uwchradd Tywyn:
 Ysgol Craig y Deryn (from 2013)
 Ysgol Gynradd Aberdyfi (before closure in 2013)
 Ysgol Gynradd Abergynolwyn (before closure in 2010)
 Ysgol Gynradd Aberllefenni (before closure in 1967)
 Ysgol Gynradd Bryncrug (before closure in 2013)
 Ysgol Gynradd Dyffryn Dulas, Corris
 Ysgol Gynradd Llanegryn (before closure in 2013)
 Ysgol Gynradd Llwyngwril (before closure in 2013)
 Ysgol Gynradd Pantperthog (before closure in 1960s)
 Ysgol Gynradd Pennal
 Ysgol Gynradd Penybryn
 Ysgol Gynradd Tynyberth, Corris Uchaf (before closure in 1967)

Notable former pupils
Tom Bradshaw (b.1992), Welsh international footballer
 Geraint Goodwin (1903–41), author of The Heyday in the Blood (1936)
 Rhodri Jones (b. 1991), Wales international rugby union player
 Lord Prys-Davies (1923–2017) of Llanegryn
Michael Raven (1938–2008), author, musician, composer and poet

Notable former teachers
 Thomas Richards (1878-1962), historian
 David Williams (1900-1978), historian

References

External links
 Ysgol Uwchradd Tywyn website

Secondary schools in Gwynedd
Educational institutions established in 1894
1894 establishments in Wales
Tywyn
Tywyn